Carrick Furnace is a historic iron furnace located at Metal Township in Franklin County, Pennsylvania. The property includes the limestone furnace stack, a Peter L. Weimer blowing engine (1879), boilers for the steam engine, and the charging ramp, engine house, and cast house foundations.  The furnace was built about 1828, and measures 30 feet square at the base and 30 feet high.  Furnace operations were suspended in 1837, the property sold in 1843, then leased in 1850 to "Witherow and Walker."  The furnace was converted in 1879 to hot blast with the installation of the steam-powered blowing engine. The furnace went out of blast in 1884, and was donated to the Franklin County Historical Society-Kittochtinney in 1935. In February 2020, the Carrick Furnace was purchased by the Path Valley Historical Society.
https://pvhistoricalsociety.wixsite.com/pvhs  

It was listed on the National Register of Historic Places in 1991.

References

External links
Carrick Furnace - Iron Furnace Ruins on Waymarking.com
Franklin County Historical Society website

Industrial buildings and structures on the National Register of Historic Places in Pennsylvania
Industrial buildings completed in 1828
Buildings and structures in Franklin County, Pennsylvania
Blast furnaces in the United States
National Register of Historic Places in Franklin County, Pennsylvania